Window on the World is an American variety show which aired on the now-defunct DuMont Television Network. The program aired from January 27, 1949, to April 14, 1949. Each episode was 30 minutes long.

Overview
Each episode featured performers from various countries, with film clips of exotic locales. Merle Kendrick conducted the orchestra. Other featured performers included comedian Gil Lamb and actress Irene Manning. The program, produced and distributed by DuMont, aired Thursday nights at 9 pm Eastern Time on most DuMont affiliates.

Episode status
The UCLA Film and Television Archive holds one episode from March 25, 1949.

See also
List of programs broadcast by the DuMont Television Network
List of surviving DuMont Television Network broadcasts

References

Bibliography
David Weinstein, The Forgotten Network: DuMont and the Birth of American Television (Philadelphia: Temple University Press, 2004) 
Alex McNeil, Total Television, Fourth edition (New York: Penguin Books, 1980) 
Tim Brooks and Earle Marsh, The Complete Directory to Prime Time Network TV Shows, Third edition (New York: Ballantine Books, 1964)

External links
 
DuMont historical website

1949 American television series debuts
1949 American television series endings
1940s American variety television series
Black-and-white American television shows
DuMont Television Network original programming
English-language television shows